Flawed may refer to:

Film and television
Flawed (film), a 2010 animated film directed by Andrea Dorfman
Flawed, a 2014 short drama with Sydney Tamiia Poitier

Literature
Flawed, a 2007 crime novel by Jo Bannister
Flawed, a 2016 dystopian novel by Cecelia Ahern

Music
"Flawed" (song), a 2006 song by Delta Goodrem released in Japan
"Flawed", a song by Pop Evil from the 2013 album Onyx
"Flawed", a song by Swervedriver from the 1991 EP Sandblasted